The 1977–78 Drexel Dragons men's basketball team represented Drexel University during the 1977–78 men's basketball season. The Dragons, led by 1st year head coach Eddie Burke, played their home games at the Daskalakis Athletic Center and were members of the East Coast Conference (ECC).

The team finished the season 13–13, and finished in 3rd place in the ECC East in the regular season.

Roster

Schedule

|-
!colspan=9 style="background:#F8B800; color:#002663;"| Regular season
|-

|-
!colspan=12 style="background:#FFC600; color:#07294D;"| ECC Tournament
|-

Awards
Bob Stephens
ECC All-Conference Second Team
Governor's Classic Tournament MVP
Governor's Classic All-Tournament Team

References

Drexel Dragons men's basketball seasons
Drexel
1977 in sports in Pennsylvania
1978 in sports in Pennsylvania